Leuconitocris argenteovittata is a species of beetle in the family Cerambycidae. It was described by Per Olof Christopher Aurivillius in 1914.

Subspecies
 Leuconitocris argenteovittata argenteovittata (Aurivillius, 1914)
 Leuconitocris argenteovittata fuscicornis (Breuning, 1950)

References

Leuconitocris
Beetles described in 1914